Speak Squeak Creak is the first album by Melt-Banana. It was first released in September 1994 by NUX Organization and re-issued by A-Zap in April 2001.

Speak Squeak Creak was recorded by Steve Albini in a basement in Chicago in June/July 1994. It was produced by KK Null.

The last untitled track is simply all 24 songs played at the same time.

Track listing

References

Melt-Banana albums
1994 debut albums
Albums produced by Steve Albini